This is a list of islands in Europe ordered by area (excluding the Canaries).

Islands over 200 km2

Islands 100–200 km2

Islands 50–100 km2

Data for some islands is missing, particularly for some Arctic islands in Russia and Svalbard.

Islands 20–50 km2

Artificial islands or not usually regarded as islands

See also
 List of Caribbean islands by area
 List of European islands by population
 List of islands by area
 List of islands by population

Notes
 Madeira and the Canary Islands are not considered part of Europe, whereas Cyprus is. Cyprus is often considered to be a part of both Asia and Europe.
 Islands of Arctic Russia are considered part of Europe as long as they are situated west of the Yamal Peninsula. This means that the islands of Franz Josef Land, Novaya Zemlya plus for example Kolguyev and Vaygach Island are considered part of Europe. Islands of Svalbard are in the same category, whereas for example islands of Greenland are considered part of North America.
 The figures of Bolshoy Berezovy, Storøya and Wahlbergøya are rough estimates from map.

Sources
 ISLANDS
 Suomen suurimmat saaret (also includes freshwater islands)
 Finland The Land of Islands and Waters
 

Islands
Islands by area
Lists of islands by area
Lists of islands by continent